Alfredo Versace (born 4 June 1969) is an Italian professional bridge player. He has been a stalwart on Italian teams for two decades and has won many European and world championships. As of July 2014 he ranks fourth among Open World Grand Masters and his regular partner Lorenzo Lauria ranks fifth.

Versace watched the game as a youngster at his grandfather's club. He played in his first tournament at the age of ten and at fifteen he joined Belladonna–Garozzo on Italy's Lavazza team in Turin.

Major bridge tournament wins
 1st World Mind Sports Games (Open Teams): 2008
 Bermuda Bowl 2005, 2013
 European Mixed Championships (Mixed Teams): 2002
 European Champions' Cup (Open Teams): 2002, 2003, 2004, 2005, 2007, 2008, 2009
 Mitchell Open BAM Teams: 2002, 2003
 Spingold Knockout Teams: 2001, 2002, 2015
 Jacoby Open Swiss: 2001	
 World Team Olympiad : 2000, 2004
 Reisinger BAM: 2000, 2007, 2010
 IOC Grand Prix: 1999
 Vanderbilt Knockout Teams: 1999, 2004
 World Team Championships: 1998, 2002, 2005
 Cavendish Invitational Teams: 1996, 1997
 European Team Championships: 1995, 1997, 2001, 2002, 2004, 2006, 2010
 European Youth Team Championship: 1992

References

External links
 
 
 Alfredo Versace at Bridge Winners 

Italian contract bridge players
Bermuda Bowl players
Living people
1969 births